António Nzayinawo commonly nicknamed Abdul or Abdul Nzayinawo (born 7 April 1994) is an Angolan international footballer who plays professionally for Petro de Luanda primarily as a defender. He use to play for AS Vita. He played at the 2014 FIFA World Cup qualification.

International goals
Scores and results list Angola's goal tally first.

References

External links
 

1994 births
Living people
Angolan footballers
Angolan expatriate footballers
Angola international footballers
Association football defenders
Atlético Petróleos de Luanda players
AS Vita Club players
Expatriate footballers in the Democratic Republic of the Congo
Footballers from Luanda